William Neff Patman (March 26, 1927 – December 9, 2008) was an American politician who served from 1981 to 1985 as a Democratic member of the United States House of Representatives for Texas's 14th congressional district. He was the son of Wright Patman, who served in the U.S. House from 1929 to 1976.

Early life and education
Patman was born in Texarkana, Texas. He attended public schools there and in Washington, D.C. He then attended the now-closed Kemper Military School in Boonville, Missouri, graduating in 1944. Patman graduated in 1953 from the University of Texas at Austin. Later that year, he was admitted to the State Bar of Texas and served as a legal examiner for the Texas Railroad Commission until 1955.

Career
He served in the United States Marine Corps as a private first class from 1945 to 1946. He subsequently served in the United States Air Force Reserve as a captain from 1953 to 1966. He was a diplomatic courier for the United States Foreign Service from 1949 to 1950. He served as the city attorney for Ganado, Texas from 1955 to 1960.

Texas Senate 
In 1960, Patman successfully sought the district 18 seat in the Texas State Senate. He took office the following year and served until 1981. He was a delegate to state Democratic Party conventions during this senatorial tenure. When President John F. Kennedy was assassinated, Patman was in the fifteenth vehicle of the motorcade.

In 1979, Patman was a member of the Killer Bees, the group of twelve quorum-busting Democratic senators that hid out in an Austin garage apartment for 4½ days.

U.S. House of Representatives 
Patman was re-elected in 1982, when U.S. Senator Lloyd M. Bentsen, Jr., of Houston led the entire Democratic ticket to its last ever full sweep of Texas statewide offices.

In 1984, however, Patman was unseated by Republican Mac Sweeney of Wharton, when Ronald W. Reagan swept Texas in his presidential reelection bid. Though Sweeney was defeated after two terms by a Democrat, the district returned to Republican representation in 1995, with the defection of Representative Greg Laughlin (who defeated Sweeney in 1988) and then the election in 1996 of former Representative Ron Paul, who defeated Laughlin in the Republican primary. After his defeat by Sweeney, Patman did not seek further office and retired to Ganado, located some ninety miles southwest of Houston, where he lived on his ranch called Ganadom.

Personal life 
Patman spent his last years in Ganado and at a second house in Austin. He died of stomach cancer at the age of eighty-one at M.D. Anderson Cancer Center in Houston. Services were held at the Texas Senate chamber; he is interred at the Texas State Cemetery in Austin. Patman's father-in-law, Fred Mauritz, was also a Texas state senator, having served from 1940 until his death, also of cancer, in 1947.

U.S. Representative Lloyd Doggett of Austin credited Patman with foreseeing the 2008 financial crisis that brought about a $700 billion bailout from Congress: "Much of his legacy — fighting predatory lenders and warning of banks deemed 'too big to fail' — testifies to his foresight."

References

External links

1927 births
2008 deaths
People from Texarkana, Texas
Deaths from cancer in Texas
Deaths from stomach cancer
Ranchers from Texas
Democratic Party Texas state senators
Texas lawyers
People from Austin, Texas
People from Ganado, Texas
University of Texas at Austin alumni
Burials at Texas State Cemetery
United States Marines
United States Air Force officers
Democratic Party members of the United States House of Representatives from Texas
20th-century American politicians
20th-century American lawyers
Military personnel from Texas